Guanlong Group is a term coined by Chen Yinke, a prominent Chinese historian, to characterize the familial alliance of several influential families or clans settled in Guanzhong (present-day Shaanxi) and Longxi Commandery (present-day southeastern Gansu). With both Han-people and Xianbei descent, the alliance prospered during Western Wei and Northern Zhou of the Northern dynasty and Sui and Tang dynasties. Its composition blended intellectuals and warriors and its members became emperors, generals, and high officials in the Northern dynasties including Sui and Tang. Their place of origin is Wuchuan.

References

Northern and Southern dynasties
Government of the Sui dynasty
Government of the Tang dynasty
Xianbei
Social history of China
Gentry families